The North Point Office Building and Tower (also known as North Point I and II) is a complex consisting of a skyscraper and an office building. It is located in downtown Cleveland, Ohio at the northeast corner of East 9th Street and Lakeside Avenue. It is the home of Cleveland founded law firm, Jones Day.

Proposal
North Point Tower was proposed by Cleveland Press owner Joseph Cole in 1979. There were plans to build a hotel on the site and an atrium displaying Press printing machines to the public. The tower would have been built on top of the 1957 structure. When the Cleveland Press folded on June 17, 1982, the North Point Plan did too.

Construction of a more modest North Point I began in 1983, and the Cleveland Press building was demolished. It was completed in 1985. North Point II (North Point Tower) was added in 1990.

Design

North Point I (North Point Building) is an unusual office structure with seven levels. Five of the levels are above grade with two below, atop foundation of the former Press building.  Its most distinctive features are its large triangular floor plans, which are split by a nine story glass angled atrium with views of Cleveland's lakefront and North Coast Harbor. It is also linked by a 1,000 car parking garage to the north and its counterpart, North Point II to the east.
Jones Day is headquartered in Phase I.

North Point II (North Point Tower) reaches 20 stories and 286 ft (87 m). It holds  of office space and is clad in colorful tile panels. It was designed by Cleveland architect Jerry Payto. The two phases (North Point I and North Point II) were built at a combined cost of $125 million and were privately financed.

The building features blue and black strip Pattern design, the blue lines contains glass windows that goes around the Building

See also
List of tallest buildings in Cleveland

External links

North Point Office Complex
ClevelandSkyscrapers.com

References

Toman, James. Cleveland's Changing Skyline, 1984. Cleveland Landmarks Press. .

Skyscraper office buildings in Cleveland
Office buildings completed in 1990